For Love or Money is a 1983 documentary which investigates role of Australian women for over 200 years in both paid and unpaid work. It is compiled using almost entirely historical material.

A copy is kept in the Australian National Film and Sound Archive.

A pictorial history book is also available, For Love or Money, a Pictorial History of Women and Work in Australia.

Plot
There are three film clips available:
 First women's union 
 Equal pay paradox
 A very efficient secretary

Awards and recognition
 Best Feature Documentary, International Cinema del Cinema delle Donne, Florence, 1984
 Nominated for both Best Documentary and Best Screenplay, Australian Film Institute Awards, 1984
 Highly Commended United Nations Media Peace Prize, 1985

References

External links
 
 
 YouTube
 NLA Trove
 

1983 films
Australian documentary films
1983 documentary films